The Macau national basketball team is the national basketball team in Macau, organized and run by the Macau - China Basketball Association. (Chinese:中國澳門籃球總會)

They have not appeared in the FIBA World Championship, but have made two appearances in the FIBA Asia Championship.

Competitions

FIBA Asia Cup

Current team
Roster at the FIBA Asia Cup 2021 Pre-Qualifiers (Eastern Region):

Past rosters
Roster at the 2017 EABA Championship:

Roster at the 2014 Lusophony Games:

Team in 2013:

Head coach position
 Li Jin – 2012-2013

See also
 Sports in Macau
 Macau national under-19 basketball team
 Macau national under-17 basketball team
 Macau national 3x3 team
 Macau women's national basketball team

References

External links
Macau-China Basketball Association 
Macau Basketball Records at FIBA Archive
Asia-Basket.com – Macau Men National Team

Men's national basketball teams
Basketball teams in Macau
Basketball in Macau
National sports teams of Macau
1979 establishments in Macau